TRNAIle-lysidine synthase (TilS, mesJ (gene), yacA (gene), isoleucine-specific transfer ribonucleate lysidine synthetase, tRNAIle-lysidine synthetase) is an enzyme with systematic name L-lysine:(tRNAIle2)-cytidine34 ligase (AMP-forming). This enzyme catalyses the following chemical reaction

 [tRNAIle2]-cytidine34 + L-lysine + ATP  [tRNAIle2]-lysidine34 + AMP + diphosphate + H2O

The bacterial enzyme modifies the wobble base of the CAU anticodon of tRNAIle at the oxo group in position 2 of cytidine34.

References

External links 
 

EC 6.3.4